Vatanappally (Vatanappilly/) is a panchayat and census town in Thrissur district, in the state of Kerala, India.It is a suburb of Thrissur city.

It is the nearest point on NH 66 from Trichur city. It is at a junction from where one can directly reach Kodungallur, Guruvayoor and Thrissur town. Vatanappally is next to Kandassankadavau (an ancient trade centre) and NH 66 passes straight through the heart of the town.

Durga devi temple, South Juma Masjid, St. Francis church and the beach are nearby tourist attractions. Every year a beach festival named Oruma is celebrated here.

Guruvayoor Temple, Palayoor Church, Thriprayar Temple, Kodungallur Cheraman Juma Masjid Vatanapally Temple, Thirumangalam temple (listed in 108 swayambu siva temples), Chavakkad Manathala Mosque, shankaramangallam shiva temple and Kodungallur Temple are some of the nearby pilgrim centres.
Vatanappally pincode :680614

Beach
A pleasant and clean beach situated on the Arabian coast just 18 km from Thrissur, the cultural capital of Kerala, is just 3 km from Vadanapilly. The coast is lined with patches of coral reef rimmed by green coconut palms. It is suited to swimming, surfing and sunbathing. The beach is linked with exotic backwaters, and it is possible to row a vanchi (a country boat) along the coconut palm fringed backwaters.

Demographics
As of 2011 Census, Vatanappally had a population of 30,657 which constitute 13,966 males and 16,691 females. The average female sex ratio was 1195 higher than the state average of 1084. 10.3% of the population was under 6 years of age. Vatanappally had an average literacy of 95.7% higher than the state average of 94%.

Transport
 Nearest airport: Cochin International Airport, Ernakulam - 60 km
 Nearest railway station: Guruvayur - 17 km
 Other railway station: Thrissur - 18 km

Organic farming
Manalur is known for organic farming. When the Indian prime minister visited Manalur in 2016, food for an audience of 3,000 was prepared in Manalur using organic farming techniques.

References

External links
 https://vadanappally.com
 http://vadanappallybeachfest.com

Cities and towns in Thrissur district